FastPencil is an American self-publishing start-up founded in 2008 by Michael Ashley. They offer a web-based publishing engine that allows authors, publishers, and enterprises to create books in print and EPUB formats and have those books distributed online and in brick-and-mortar stores through partnerships with Amazon, Barnes & Noble, Ingram, and others.

In 2013 FastPencil was acquired by Courier Corporation, but was reacquired in May by its co-founder, Steve Wilson, after Courier's acquisition by R.R. Donnelley in 2015.

References

External links 
 

Publishing companies established in 2008
Online publishing companies of the United States
American companies established in 2008